McDonald's massacre may refer to:
San Ysidro McDonald's massacre
Sydney River McDonald's murders
2016 Munich shooting
Taiwan McDonald's bombings

See also
Zhaoyuan McDonald's Cult Murder
Magnificent Mile shooting which occurred near a McDonald’s at Chicago, Illinois
Criticism of McDonald's